Dmitry Nikolayevich Sergeyev (born 22 December 1968 in Perm, Soviet Union) is a Russian judoka.

Achievements

External links 
 
 

1968 births
Living people
Soviet male judoka
Russian male judoka
Judoka at the 1992 Summer Olympics
Judoka at the 1996 Summer Olympics
Olympic judoka of the Unified Team
Olympic judoka of Russia
Olympic bronze medalists for the Unified Team
Olympic medalists in judo
Medalists at the 1992 Summer Olympics
Sportspeople from Perm, Russia